The Dallara T08 was a racing car developed by Italian manufacturer Dallara for use in the Formula Renault 3.5 series, and was in use from 2008 to 2011. The T08 is the second generation of car used by the World Series by Renault/WS Formula V8 3.5, and was introduced at Circuit de Nevers Magny-Cours. The carbon tub of the car would later be carried over to its successor, the Dallara T12.

Design 
The new car featured flex-fuel technology and could be powered by either premium unleaded petrol or E85 bioethanol, which was a first for this level of motorsport in Europe.

The car also featured a new carbon bodyshell, as well as a new shaped front wing, hollowed sidepods and multiple side deflectors designed to improve aerodynamic performance. However, several areas of the car, including the gearbox, rear suspension and carbon brakes, remained the same in order to keep costs under control.

The new car made its first public appearance on 21 September at the Magny-Cours round of the 2007 season, with development driver Andy Soucek demonstrating the car at the final round of the series in Barcelona.

Subsequent Development and Changes

2009 FR 3.5 Series 

The car underwent a number of changes to its aerodynamic configuration, in line with the 2009 Formula One technical changes. This saw the removal of the cars bargeboards, sidepod chimneys, and the flip-ups ahead of the rear wheel.

2010 FR 3.5 Series 
Following the 2009 season, a few changes were made to the car, under the series Technical Regulations for the 2010 Formula Renault 3.5 Series. The engines were re–tuned from 8,200 RPM to 8,500 RPM, with Boost control being banned.

References

External links 

 Dallara Official Website

Formula Renault 3.5 series